O.J.: Made in America is a 2016 American documentary, produced and directed by Ezra Edelman for ESPN Films and their 30 for 30 series. It was released as a five-part miniseries and in theatrical format. The documentary explores race and celebrity through the life of O. J. Simpson, from his emerging football career at the University of Southern California, and his celebrity and popularity within American culture, to his trial for the murders of Nicole Brown Simpson and Ronald Lyle Goldman, and subsequent acquittal, and how he was convicted and imprisoned for the Las Vegas robbery 13 years later. O.J.: Made in America premiered at the Sundance Film Festival on January 22, 2016, and was theatrically released in New York City and Los Angeles in May 2016. It debuted on ABC on June 11, 2016, and aired on ESPN.

The documentary received critical acclaim and won the Academy Award for Best Documentary Feature at the 89th Academy Awards. It was the longest film in the 30 for 30 catalogue and longest film to ever receive an Oscar nomination and win (surpassing War and Peace). The documentary became the last of its type to be nominated and win an Oscar after a new Academy rule barred any "multi-part or limited series" from being eligible for the documentary categories. Edelman received the Primetime Emmy Award for Outstanding Directing for Nonfiction Programming for his work on this project. The series also received a Peabody Award for its work.

Premise
Through interviews, news footage, and archival audio and video, O.J.: Made in America traces the life and career of O. J. Simpson, starting with his arrival at the University of Southern California as an emerging football superstar and ending with his incarceration in 2007 for robbery.  Throughout the documentary, Simpson's life – the football success, television & acting career, relationship with Nicole Brown, the domestic abuse, Nicole and Ron Goldman's murder, the trial – runs parallel to the larger narrative of the city of Los Angeles, which serves as host to mounting racial tensions, and a volatile relationship between the city's police department and the African American community. Footage from the Watts Riots was used as well as the entire Rodney King video, which most news outlets and documentaries only use in parts. Both of these events are used to set up and explain what happened during the Simpson murder trial.

Television critic James Poniewozik described the director's technique in his New York Times review: "Ezra Edelman pulls back, way back, like a news chopper over a freeway chase. Before you hear about the trial, the documentary says, you need to hear all the stories – the stories of race, celebrity, sports, America – that it's a part of."

Production
Development of a documentary based on Simpson for ESPN Films began in 2007, eventually leading to the hiring of Brett Morgen to create the film, June 17, 1994, also part of the 30 for 30 series. Released in June 2010, June 17, 1994 used solely archive footage from several sporting events that occurred on June 17, 1994, to chronicle the events of the police chase of O. J. Simpson. ESPN Films executive producer Connor Schell said, "If you are going to do O. J. Simpson, you are going to cover June 1994 to Oct. 1995 – it is unavoidable. But if you are interested in things that came before it and after it, then it has to be longer than the traditional two-hour form." This led to a meeting between Schell and director Ezra Edelman in February 2014, where Schell expressed interest in creating a five-hour documentary on Simpson. Edelman initially declined, as he felt "there was nothing left to say about him". Edelman eventually agreed to the project, realizing that Simpson's trial did not have to be the focus, or if he was innocent or guilty, rather, Edelman "could use that canvas to tell a deeper story about race in America, about the city of Los Angeles, the relationship between the black community and the police, and who O. J. was and his rise to celebrity. That's the story I wanted to tell."

Throughout the 18-month process from conception to completion, Edelman conducted 72 interviews for the documentary, "including key players from the prosecution (Marcia Clark, Gil Garcetti and Bill Hodgman), Simpson's defense team (F. Lee Bailey, Carl E. Douglas and Barry Scheck), childhood friends of Simpson (Joe Bell and Calvin Tennyson), relatives of Simpson (cousin Dwight Tucker), fellow football players (Jim Brown and Earl Edwards), jurors from the criminal trial (Carrie Bess and Yolanda Crawford), former LAPD detectives involved in the case (Mark Fuhrman and Tom Lange) and African-American civil rights activists (Dr. Harry Edwards, Danny Bakewell and Cecil Murray)", and people who could speak on behalf of Ron Goldman (his father Fred Goldman) and Nicole Brown Simpson (her sister Tanya Brown, her friends David LeBon and Robin Greer, and her boyfriend Keith Zlomsowitch). Also interviewed were people connected to Simpson such as his agent Mike Gilbert along with Tom Riccio and Bruce Fromong, who were each involved parties of the 2008 robbery.

Edelman also reached out to Simpson through a letter, which was never answered; he had also hoped to include Simpson's first wife, Marguerite L. Whitley, who could not be contacted, and former L.A. County district attorney Christopher Darden, who declined participation. Despite envisioning the project as a five-hour documentary, the final film was screened to ESPN Films executives at 7.5 hours in length, to which Schell said they would figure out the programming end, as they were "going to give Ezra the time he needs to tell this story". The initial plan was to break the film into three parts – "everything leading up to the murder and then the trial and then everything after the trial" – before a five-part format was settled on. In January 2016, ESPN Films announced O.J.: Made in America for part of their 30 for 30 series.

Ishmael Reed was interviewed by director Ezra Edelman for O.J.: Made in America, however his interview wasn't used in the documentary. Reed was critical of the documentary in an article he wrote for the magazine CounterPunch. He stated, “In the series, other prosecutors yammered on and on about theories that were disproven in court. A detective who might have planted evidence was allowed to take up time. In order to make the case that the decision in the criminal trial was based on black grievances about the LAPD, or Mark Furhman, they used a black juror whose opinion fit this marketable line instead of jurors who voted on the basis of evidence that had been tampered with. The late Philip Vannatter never explained why he carried a vial of the victim’s blood to O.J.’s estate.”

Music

Release
O.J.: Made in America premiered at the Sundance Film Festival on January 22, 2016, with one intermission, and was also screened at the Tribeca Film Festival on April 23, 2016, and the Hot Docs Canadian International Documentary Festival in Toronto on April 29 and 30. The documentary had a theatrical run with two intermissions at Cinema Village in New York City and the Laemmle Theatre in Santa Monica, California from May 20–26, 2016. The first part debuted on television on June 11, 2016, on ABC, followed by parts two through five airing on ESPN on June 14, 15, 17 and 18, respectively. The entire documentary was made available on WatchESPN on June 14, 2016, after the airing of the second part. In subsequent airings of the fourth part, graphic crime scene photos were blurred by ESPN, to allow the re-airings to occur "at various times." The images were not blurred in the original airing or in the version available "on demand to viewers online or via cable VOD services."

Reception
On review aggregator website Rotten Tomatoes, the film has an approval rating of 100%, based on 53 reviews, with an average rating of 9.27/10. The site's critical consensus reads, "O.J.; Made in America paints a balanced and thorough portrait of the American dream juxtaposed with tragedy and executed with power and skill." On Metacritic, which assigns a weighted average rating to reviews, the film has a score of 96 out of 100, based on 21 critics, indicating "universal acclaim".

Kenneth Turan and Mary McNamara of the Los Angeles Times both praised O.J.: Made in America, with Turan stating, the film "is an exceptional 7 1/2-hour documentary, so perceptive, empathetic and compelling you want it never to end", with McNamara adding, "Historically meticulous, thematically compelling and deeply human, O.J.: Made in America is a masterwork of scholarship, journalism and cinematic art." Sports Illustrateds Richard Deitsch called the film "the best 30 for 30 documentary [ESPN] has ever produced. It is thrilling and uncompromising filmmaking... and it will make you look at the most famous murder case in United States history with fresh eyes and under a larger prism." Brian Tallerico, writing for RogerEbert.com, awarded the film four stars out of four, stating, "Even in this era of 'Peak TV', it's rare to see something as essential and momentous as ESPN's OJ: Made in America... Ezra Edelman's stunningly ambitious, eight-hour documentary is a masterpiece, a refined piece of investigative journalism that places the subject it illuminates into the broader context of the end of the 20th century... I would have watched it for another eight hours... It's that good."

Daniel Feinberg of The Hollywood Reporter said, "O.J.: Made in America is a provocative, intelligent and thorough documentary that tears along at an impressive clip given its length, with tragedy around every corner. The first miniseries to air under the ESPN Films and 30 for 30 banners, it also instantly takes its place among the banner's best efforts", while Hank Stuever for The Washington Post called it "nothing short of a towering achievement". Varietys Brian Lowry added, "even in the annals of ESPN's 30 for 30 docs, [Ezra Edelman has created] what feels like a master opus – one that deals with the nexus of race, celebrity and sports, and the strange juxtaposition of a figure who prided himself on transcending color, yet ultimately relied upon it when charged with the murder of his ex-wife, Nicole, and Ronald Goldman."

A. O. Scott of The New York Times felt the film "has the grandeur and authority of the best long-form nonfiction. If it were a book, it could sit on the shelf alongside The Executioner's Song by Norman Mailer and the great biographical works of Robert Caro. It's very much a film, though, a feat of tireless research, dogged interviewing and skillful editing." However, Scott felt a "significant blind spot" for the film was its "predominance of male voices among the interview subjects, and the narrowness of the film's discussion of domestic violence... [T]he film, which so persuasively treats law enforcement racism as a systemic problem, can't figure out how to treat violence against women with the same kind of rigor or nuance", adding that "O. J. Simpson is viewed as a symbol" while "Nicole Brown Simpson's fate, in contrast, is treated as an individual tragedy, and there seems to be no political vocabulary available to the filmmakers to understand what happened to her. The deep links between misogyny and American sports culture remain unexamined."

Accolades

References

External links
 
 

2010s American television miniseries
2016 documentary films
30 for 30
Best Documentary Feature Academy Award winners
Cultural depictions of O. J. Simpson
Documentaries about racism
Documentary films about criminals
Documentary films about sportspeople
Documentary films about American football
O. J. Simpson murder case
Peabody Award-winning broadcasts
Films directed by Ezra Edelman
Primetime Emmy Award-winning broadcasts
2010s English-language films
Documentary films about actors
2010s American films